La Roja, may refer to:

Chile national basketball team
Chile national football team
Spain national football team